The Department of Home Affairs was an Australian government department that existed between 1901 and 1916. It was one of seven inaugural government departments of Australia established at federation.

Scope
Information about the department's functions and/or government funding allocation could be found in the Administrative Arrangements Orders, the annual Portfolio Budget Statements and in the Department's annual reports.

At its creation, the Department dealt with:
Old-age pensions
People of special races
Acquisition of property
Acquisition of railways with State consent
Control of railways with State consent
Astronomical
Census and Statistics
Public Works
Federal Capital
Interstate Commissions
Elections
Public Service

Structure
The Department was an Australian Public Service department, staffed by officials who were responsible to the Minister for Home Affairs.

References

Home Affairs
Ministries established in 1901